was a Japanese rock band composed of lead singer ,  on guitar,  on drums and  on keyboards.

Biography 
They were not an instant hit initially, but their fourth single  broke the top 50 of the Oricon charts. Eventually, the single  got a lot of attention since it was used in the DNA^2 anime series, breaking into the top 10. The next single , also broke into the top 10. "Zurui Onna" is the 84th best-selling single in Japan of all-time. Their 11th single, topped the charts in 1996.

In 1997, the band held an audition on the evening show ASAYAN to find a new female vocalist. While the audition eventually yielded winner Michiyo Heike, the competition would be the impetus for the formation of Morning Musume. Runners-up Yuko Nakazawa, Natsumi Abe, Kaori Iida, Aya Ishiguro, and Asuka Fukuda took up Tsunku's offer after the competition to form a group he would personally produce if they could sell 50,000 copies of their debut independent single Ai no Tane in five days. The mission was accomplished in four.

During this period, Tsunku focused on establishing Morning Musume's career and the formation of Hello! Project stable. Makoto would frequently act as an emcee during these concerts.

During the end of 2006 and early 2007, Hakate, Makoto, and Taisei would frequently appear on the short music show Uta Doki! to play their respective instruments in support of the guest vocalist.

Sharam Q became active again in 2006, having released a new single entitled   in November 2006. Tsunku originally wrote and composed the song for Morning Musume, who debuted their recording two weeks before Sharam Q's rendition.

In March 2014, Tsunku announced on his blog that he had laryngeal cancer, which he found out after having throat surgery due to an unspecified condition. On April 4, 2015, Tsunku revealed that he had his vocal cords removed as part of his cancer treatment, and Sharam Q's activities then ceased.

Discography

Singles

Albums

Filmography
Sharam Q no Enka no Hanamichi (1997)

External links 
  Sharam Q's official website

Japanese pop rock music groups
Japanese power pop groups
Japanese rock music groups
Musical groups from Osaka
Up-Front Group